Towles may refer to:

Towles (surname), including a list of people with the name
Towles, California, former name of Towle, California
Towles Intermediate School, Fort Wayne, Indiana
Towles Glacier